The Nathan Ayres House is a single-family home located at 604 North Water Street in Owosso, Michigan. It was added to the National Register of Historic Places in 1980.

History
Nathan Ayres was born in 1842 and arrived in Owosso as a young man. He was a brick mason by trade, and was well-off enough that in about 1883 he constructed this brick home on North Water Street. Little more is known about Nathan, but his daughter, Effie, (born in 1867), was educated in Owosso  and taught in the local school system for many years before being promoted to principal at Owosso's Central School.

Description
The Nathan Ayres House is an Italianate structure with a distinctive five-sided bay on the front facade. It has tall one-over-one double hung sash windows topped with carved stone lintels, a broad front porch, and squared brackets underneath the eaves of a hipped roof.

References

		
National Register of Historic Places in Shiawassee County, Michigan
Italianate architecture in Michigan
Houses completed in 1883